The 1922 City of London by-election was a parliamentary by-election held on 19 May 1922 for the British House of Commons constituency of City of London, which covered the "Square Mile" which was the United Kingdom's traditional financial district.

The seat had become vacant on the elevation to the peerage of one of the constituency's two Unionist Members of Parliament (MPs), Arthur James Balfour, as the Earl of Balfour.

Balfour had held the seat since a by-election in 1906, following his defeat at Manchester East in the 1906 general election. He had also been Prime Minister between 1902 and 1905.

Candidates 
The Unionist Party selected as its candidate Edward Grenfell, who was a director of the Bank of England. Sir Vansittart Bowater, who had been Lord Mayor of London in 1913, stood as an Independent Unionist.

Results 
Turnout was unsurprisingly low in the first contested election in the City since the first 1910 general election. Grenfell won the seat by a convincing margin.

Curiously, Bowater would go on to be elected as the official Unionist candidate at a by-election in 1924, and he and Grenfell would share the representation of the City until 1935.

Votes

See also
 List of United Kingdom by-elections
 City of London constituency
 1904 City of London by-election
 February 1906 City of London by-election
 June 1906 City of London by-election
 1924 City of London by-election
 1935 City of London by-election
 1938 City of London by-election
 1940 City of London by-election
 1945 City of London by-election

References
 
 

1922 elections in the United Kingdom
1922 in London
City of London,1922
1922
May 1922 events